Songs and Sonnets Atlantean is a collection of poems by Donald S. Fryer. It was released in 1971 by Arkham House in an edition of 2,045 copies.  The introduction and notes attributed to Dr. Ibid M. Andor are actually written by Fryer.

Contents

Songs and Sonnets Atlantean contains the following poems:

 "Introduction", by Dr. Ibid M. Andor (pseud. of Fryer)
 "Avalonessys"
 "The Crown and Trident Imperial"
 "Atlantis"
 "The Rose and the Thorn"
 "Rose Escariate"
 "'O Ebon-Colored Rose'"
 "Your Mouth of Pomegranate"
 "As Buds and Blossoms in the Month of May the Rose"
 "To Clark Ashton Smith"
 "Pavane"
 "When We Were Prince and Princess"
 "The Crown and Trident"
 "Song"
 "'Thy Spirit Walks the Sea'"
 "Recompense"
 "To a Youth"
 "Spenserian Stanza-Sonnet Empourpré"
 "A Symbol for All Splendor Lost"
 "The Ashes in the Rose Garden"
 "To Edmund Spenser"
 "Rose Verdastre"
 "Ave Atque Vale"
 "Thaïs and Alexander in Persepolis"
 "A Fragment"
 "O fair dark eyes, O glances turned aside"
 "The Sydnus"
 "Golden Mycenae"
 "Lullaby"
 Minor Chronicles of Atlantis
 "Proem"
 "The Hippokamp"
 "The Alpha Huge"
 "The River Called Amphus"
 "The Amphus Delta"
 "The Imperial Crown Jewels of Atlantis"
 "The Atlantean Obelisk"
 "The Garden of Jealous Roses"
 "The Tale of an Olden Love"
 "The Shepherd and the Shepherdess"
 "Reciprocity"
 "The Iffinnix"
 "A Vision of Strange Splendor"
 "Kilcolman Castle: 20 August 1965"
 "Aubade"
 "The Lilac Hedge at Cassell Prairie: 27 May 1967"
 "Black Poppy and Black Lotus"
 "The House of Roses"
 "'The Musical Note of Swans...Before Their Death'"
 "Green Sleeves"
 "O Beautiful Dark-Amber Eyes of Old"
 "The Forsaken Palace"
 "For the 'Shapes of Clay' of Ambrose Bierce"
 "Connaissance Fatale"
 "For the 'Black Beetles in Amber' of Ambrose Bierce"
 "Offrande Exotique"
 Sonnets on an Empire of Many Waters
I. "Here, where the fountains of the deep-sea flow"
II. "Atlantis"
III. "Gades"
IV. "Atlantigades"
V. "Atkantharia"
VI. "Iffrikonn-Yssthia"
VII. "Atalantessys"
VIII. "Atlantillia"
IX. "Atatemthessys"
X. "At-Thulonn"
XI. "Avalonessys"
XII. "Poseidonis"
XIII. "The Merchant-Princes"
XIV. "An Argosy of Trade"
XV. "Memories of the Astazhan"
XVI. "A Letter from Valoth"
XVII. "No, not until the final age of Earth"
 "Notes", by Dr. Ibid M. Andor (Fryer)

References

1971 poetry books
American poetry collections
Atlantis in fiction